The Pegasus UAV is a solar powered unmanned aircraft developed by Flemish Institute for Technological Research (VITO). It is being created from the cooperation between the Flemish Institute for Technological Research and Alcatel. It aims to hook up into ESA's earth monitoring system GMES, and will also be used for disaster preparedness and environmental monitoring. 

It is similar (though smaller) than the Helios, and of the same size as the DLR UAV and ESA Heliplat.

External links 
 Pegasus UAV Main Website

Solar-powered aircraft